Marie Overbye (born 19 January 1976) is an athlete from Denmark, born in Silkeborg.  She competes in triathlon.

Her best international results include a fourth place at the Triathlon World Championships 1997 in Perth, Australia, as well as a 2nd and 3rd rank in the World Cup in 1998 and 2000.

Overbye competed at the first Olympic triathlon at the 2000 Summer Olympics.  She took twenty-eighth place with a total time of 2:07:17.51.

External links
Official website 

Danish female triathletes
Triathletes at the 2000 Summer Olympics
Olympic triathletes of Denmark
People from Silkeborg
1976 births
Living people
Duathletes
Sportspeople from the Central Denmark Region